Kommunar or Komunar may refer to:
Kommunar (inhabited locality), several inhabited localities in Russia
Komunar Raion, a district of Zaporizhia, Ukraine
Kommunar (tractor), a tractor formerly produced in the Soviet Union by Malyshev Factory
Kommunar, transliteration of the Russian spelling of communard
Kommunar, the Norwegian Nynorsk spelling for commune, used to refer to the municipalities of Norway